Vladimir Modosyan (born 16 June 1958) is a former Soviet Armenian Freestyle wrestler. He is a World Champion, two-time European Championships silver medalist, and World Cup winner.

Biography
Modosyan started wrestling in 1968. In 1975, he moved to Krasnoyarsk and started training under the guidance of the honored coach of the USSR Dmitry Mindiashvili. From 1982 to 1987, Modosyan was a member of the Soviet national freestyle wrestling team. He came in first place at the 1985 Wrestling World Cup. Modosyan had his most successful year in 1986, when he won the gold medal at the 1986 World Wrestling Championships and 1986 Goodwill Games. He won his second silver medal at the 1987 European Wrestling Championships.

After completing his wrestling career, he took up coaching, becoming part of the coaching staff of the Russian national freestyle wrestling team. The most famous disciples of Vladimir Modosyan are the Russian Champion and World Championship medalist Albert Saritov and the two-time World Champion Viktor Lebedev.

References

1958 births
Living people
People from Gori, Georgia
Armenian male sport wrestlers
Russian male sport wrestlers
Soviet male sport wrestlers
World Wrestling Championships medalists
Goodwill Games medalists in wrestling
European Wrestling Championships medalists
Competitors at the 1986 Goodwill Games